In chess, the fianchetto ( or ;  "little flank") is a pattern of  wherein a bishop is developed to the second  of the adjacent b- or g-, the  having been moved one or two squares forward.

It also regularly occurs in Indian defences.

One of the major benefits of the fianchetto is that it often allows the fianchettoed bishop to become more active. A fianchettoed position, however, also presents some opportunities for the opponent: if the fianchettoed bishop can be exchanged, the squares the bishop was formerly protecting will become weak (see ) and can form the basis of an attack (particularly if the fianchetto was performed on the ). Exchanging the fianchettoed bishop should not be done lightly, therefore, especially if the enemy bishop on same-coloured squares is still on the board.

Concept
The diagram shows three different sorts of fianchetti (not from an actual game, but as examples collapsed into a single diagram). This is by far the most common type of fianchetto, seen in the Sicilian Dragon, Pirc Defence, Modern Defence, Modern Benoni, Grünfeld Defence, Nimzo-Indian, and King's Indian Defence, among other openings. The regular fianchetto of both bishops by a player is called a double financhetto.  

Black's  is also fianchettoed, but the knight pawn has moved forward two squares, making this a long fianchetto. The b-pawn also controls the c4-square, which is often advantageous. If White plays the King's Indian Attack 1.Nf3 2.g3, Black may play a long  fianchetto to oppose White's bishop and make it more difficult for White to play a c4 . A long fianchetto on the kingside is more rarely played, because it weakens the pawn shield in front of the castled position and controls a less important square. Nevertheless, Grob's Attack 1.g4 and the Borg Defence ("Grob" backwards) 1.e4 g5 are sometimes played by players such as IM Michael Basman.

White's queen bishop has moved to a3 in what is sometimes called an extended fianchetto. Rather than control the long diagonal, it takes aim at Black's f8-square. If Black moves his e-pawn, White can play Bxf8, after which Black will have to waste  on artificial castling after recapturing with his king. This tactic is often seen in the Evans Gambit and gives the Benko Gambit much of its bite. Black often plays ...Ba6 in the French Defence, and in the Queen's Indian Defence if White plays g3 in order to fianchetto his own bishop (Aron Nimzowitsch's move against the classical main line).

Four fianchettoed bishops

The game Rubinstein–Nimzowitsch, Marienbad 1925, had four fianchettoed bishops, two developed knights, and two on their home squares. In this position, Nimzowitsch humorously pointed out in My System: "Each side castles now with a clear conscience, for not even the most hypermodern pair of masters can produce more than four fianchettoed Bishops!"

References

Bibliography

Further reading

  “The Chess Fianchetto” by Edward Winter

Chess terminology
Italian words and phrases